Hans Caspersen House (Danish: Hans Caspersens Gård) may refer to

 Overgaden Oven Vandet 50, a building in Copenhagen, Denmark
 Overgaden Neden Vandet 39, a building in Copenhagen, Denmark
 Overgaden Neden Vandet 33, a building in Copenhagen, Denmark